Raging Waters are a chain of four water theme parks in Sacramento, San Dimas, San Jose, California, and Sydney, Australia. The parks are operated by Palace Entertainment and owned by its parent company Parques Reunidos, but they each contain different attractions. The parks are generally closed during the winter months.

Raging Waters Los Angeles

Raging Waters Los Angeles opened June 18, 1983, located in Los Angeles County in the city of San Dimas, near SR 57 between Interstate 10 and Interstate 210. Park officials described it as California's largest water park in 2011. The park was formerly known as "Raging Waters San Dimas", but as of 2016, official media was using the name "Raging Waters Los Angeles" for this location. The park was featured in the 1989 movie, Bill & Ted's Excellent Adventure.

Attractions

Aqua Rocket is a coaster-style slide that uses magnetic propulsion to propel a raft up hills.

Amazon Adventure is a quarter-mile-long, tropical river that runs through a section of the park. Riders sit in rafts as the current pulls them around the river route.

Bermuda Triangle consists of three twisting, turning, downward tunnels that recycle more than 2,500 gallons of water a minute and make riders feel like they have entered the Bermuda Triangle.

Bombs Away will open in 2023. It will be two trapdoor slides one with an open free fall drop and the other with an enclosed loop.

Dark Hole is a system of two fiberglass tunnels with a total drop of fifty-two feet. Riders used to sit in a single-person raft identical to the ones used in Amazon River, but as of 2016 riders sit in a two-person raft speeding through the total darkness of the long flumes, the first of its kind in the country. Riders travel at a speed of 26 miles per hour.

Dr. Von Dark's Tunnel of Terror is a slide in which riders experience a 40-foot drop into a dark tunnel. Riders will then drop into a small mini-funnel.

Dragon's Den is a slide which debuted in 2004 and is a two-rider tube ride that sends guests plummeting down a steep  tunnel, circling around a  bowl  until they fall through a secret tunnel at the bottom. As of 2016, Dragon's Den is ridden as a single-rider with tubes identical to the ones used in Amazon River.

DropOut is a seven-story body slide. Riders plunge at a near free fall, reaching speeds close to 40 miles per hour. Some riders will lift off the slide when coming down. As of 2021 season was closed and removed.

Other parks

Raging Waters San Jose is located in Lake Cunningham Park in East San Jose, adjacent to Capitol Expressway, Eastridge Mall, Eastridge Transit Center and Reid-Hillview Airport. The park opened to the public in 1985, and is the largest water park in Northern California.

Raging Waters Sydney is located in Greater Western Sydney, and was formerly known as Wet'n'Wild until being acquired in 2018 by Parques Reunidos.

Raging Waters Sacramento water park is located at Cal Expo and was formerly known as Six Flags Waterworld. Palace Entertainment would terminate there lease on November 8th, 2022 "after a careful review of company priorities". 

There is a park named Raging Waters in Wildwood, New Jersey, but only the three California Raging Waters parks are owned by Palace Entertainment. Until early 2011, there was also a Raging Waters park in Salt Lake City, Utah, later operated as Seven Peaks Salt Lake. The Raging Waters/Seven Peaks park in Salt Lake City would close down in 2018 with the site being demolished in 2021.

References

External links
 

Amusement parks in California
Water parks in California
Palace Entertainment
Tourist attractions in Sacramento, California
Tourist attractions in Los Angeles County, California
Tourist attractions in Los Angeles